Raj Amit Kumar is a filmmaker and writer known for his socio-political drama Unfreedom which is banned in India as it dealt with religious fundamentalism and violence against homosexuals. The film was released in the U.S. in 2015, and won a UFVA Faculty Screenwriting Award in 2009, and several other International Awards. The film was later acquired by and released on NETFLIX despite its continued ban by Censor Board of India. His Second film Brown is in post-production, and he is currently shooting an Untitled Web Series.

Filmmaker and writer
Unfreedom, a socio-political drama, is his first feature film. Set in New York and New Delhi, the film deals with issues of identity and violence. The film stars Victor Banerjee and Adil Hussain.
 
In a recent interview, Victor Banerjee commended Raj Amit Kumar for his approach to sex and violence in this film, which were an essential part of the story and screenplay, even though he has usually condemned the vulgarity with which these are approached in mainstream cinema.

National Film Awards winner Hari Nair is the cinematographer of the film. Academy Award winner Resul Pookutty has done the sound design and the original music score is by Filmfare Awards winner Wayne Sharpe and Jesse Kotansky.

The script for the film won the first prize in the 2009 Faculty Screenwriting Competition at University Film and Video Association.

Kumar is shooting his next film, titled Brown in Butte, Montana,

Media academic and speaker
Kumar graduated with a Masters of Arts in Cinema and Media Studies from College of Staten Island (CUNY) in 2006, where he received the George Custen Memorial Award for Academic Excellence. He has also been awarded by the National Scholarship of India for Academic Excellence, and a First Prize in Faculty Screenwriting Award at University Film and Video Association (UFVA) 2009. Having finished his PhD coursework and taking PHD ABD in Cinema and Media studies at Southern Illinois University Carbondale (SIUC) he began work on his first feature-length film Unfreedom.

He is also a media academic, teacher, and writer. He has taught cinema theory and history at both his alma maters between the years 2005 to 2009, and his writings and research papers have been published and presented at various conferences as well.

Fight against censorship
In India, Unfreedom was refused certification by the Examining Committee; a revising committee of the Censor Board proposed cuts which Kumar refused. He appealed to the Indian Government's Information and Broadcasting Appellate Tribunal FCAT, and in response, the Tribunal completely banned the film. Recently, the news of banning has gained widespread coverage in the media, bringing other filmmakers into the fight against censorship.

See also
 Cinema of India
 Parallel Cinema

References

External links
 Dark Frames website
 Kumar's personal website
 

Film directors from Florida
1978 births
Living people
Southern Illinois University Carbondale alumni
College of Staten Island alumni
American male screenwriters
American film directors of Indian descent